Football Inter Club Association; (commonly referred to as FICA) is a professional football club based in Cap-Haïtien, Haiti.

The club has been a very successful club in Haitian football history, winning 7 titles in 1989, 1990, 1991, 1994, 1998, 2001, 2015 C.

History
The Football Inter Club Association (FICA) was founded on 17 October 1972 in a room at the Collège Notre-Dame du Perpétuel Secours on the initiative of a group of young students, all originally from Cap-Haïtien, following a national football school championship and the return of a victorious tour in the Dominican Republic.

As president was chosen Dudré Génard, as general secretary Paul Calixte and as treasurer Rev. Yvon Joseph; the technical guide was entrusted to Hervé Calixte and Charles Vertilis. The first players of FICA were Daniel Albert , Ricot St-Juste, Frantzy Mathieu, Joseph Duverglas, Serge Célestin, Jean Robert Télusma, René Monestime, Daniel Cadet, Antony Byas, Robert Noel, Frantz Telusmond, Gary César, Jocelyn Zépherin, Killick Jean-Louis, Claude Louis Charles, Michel Desravines, Guy Prosper and Wilfrid Zépherin.

On November 26 of that year, FICA played their inaugural match against Etoile Haïtienne at the Parc Saint-Victor of Cap-Haïtien and was defeated 0–1. The next day, a rematch was held with FICA defeating Etoile Haïtienne 1–0 scored by Wilfrid Zépherin.

In 1973, FICA became affiliated with the "Ligue du Nord" (League of the North), and the club took part in its first championship, where they came in second.

In 1975, FICA becomes champions of the Ligue du Nord. From 1976 to 1983, FICA becomes champions of Cap-Haïtien three times, winning the "Coupe Pharmacie du Centre" in 1976, and the "Coupe Henry Christophe" in 1979 and 1983.

National integration era

During the season 1988–1989, the national of championship integrated clubs outside of the Port-au-Prince area with the twenty best clubs of the country in a league-wide format for the first time. Clubs were divided into two groups of ten, as the preliminary phase saw four teams play the final phase: Violette, Aigle Rouge, AS Capoise and FICA.

FICA defeated ASC, as Violette defeated Aigle Rouge in the semifinals. FICA won the first leg against Violette 1–0 in Cap-Haïtien and returned to Port-au-Prince and defeated Violette 1–2 to win its first national championship.

Squad 
As of 24 April 2021:

Records

Top goalscorers

Honours
Ligue Haïtienne: 7
 1989, 1990, 1994, 1998, 2001, 2015 C, 2016 C.

International competitions
CONCACAF Champions League: 2 appearances
1990 – Second Round (Caribbean Zone) - Lost against  Pinar del Río, 1–4 on aggregate (1–1 & 0–3)
1995 – Second Round (Caribbean Zone) - Withdrew

References

Football clubs in Haiti
Association football clubs established in 1972
Nord (Haitian department)